The 2014 Prague municipal election was held as part of 2014 Czech municipal elections. It was held on 10 and 11 October 2014. ANO 2011 won the election and Adriana Krnáčová became the first female mayor of Prague.

Prior election, there was a conflict whether Prague should be one or 7 electoral district. It was decided that there will be only one district.

Opinion polling

Results
ANO 2011 won more than 20% of votes and 17 seats. TOP 09 came second with 16 seats. Other parties that got over 5% threshold were Three-Coalition (Green Party, Christian and Democratic Union – Czechoslovak People's Party and Mayors and Independents), Civic Democratic Party, Czech Social Democratic Party, Communist Party of Bohemia and Moravia and Czech Pirate Party.

External links
2014 Czech municipal election (Ministry of the Interior of the Czech Republic)

References

2014
Prague municipal election
Municipal election  2014